USS Thrush may refer to the following ships of the United States Navy:

 , laid down on 27 May 1918 at Wilmington, Delaware.
 , laid down as AMS-204 on 7 May 1954 at Tampa, Florida.

References 

United States Navy ship names